Sealord Hotel is a building situated in the city of Kochi, Kerala, India. It was the first high-rise building in Kerala. It was constructed in 1966. It is also the first concrete-piled building in South India.

Hotels established in 1966
Hotels in Kochi